Dornröschen (English: Sleeping Beauty) is a marble sculpture by Louis Sussmann-Hellborn, housed at Alte Nationalgalerie in Berlin, Germany.

References

External links

 

Marble sculptures in Germany
Sculptures of women in Germany
Sleeping Beauty